Donna Karen Fraser  (born 7 November 1972) in Thornton Heath, Croydon is an English former athlete, who mainly competed in the 200 and 400 m.

Career
An exceptional junior, Fraser won six English Schools 200 m titles (as well as a silver medal for the 4 × 100 m at the 1990 World Junior Championships) before turning to the 400 m in 1991 and becoming European Junior Champion at the distance the same year (also gaining a silver medal for the 4 × 100 m). However, she didn't improve until 1996, when she began to concentrate on the 400 m seriously and qualified for British teams in the major outdoor championships between 1996 and 1999. However, it was at the Sydney Olympics in 2000 that she finally showed the potential she had had as a junior, when she clipped almost a second off her PB to finish fourth with a personal best time of 49.79 seconds, thanks in no small part to her training alongside Olympic champion Cathy Freeman for that season.

An individual finalist in 1998 at the European Championships and Commonwealth Games (where she took a bronze medal), Fraser has also played an integral part of Britain's 4 x 400 m relay team, taking medals at the 1998 European Championships and Commonwealth Games, and 2005 World Championships. She also won the BBC London Athlete of the Year Award for 2005. But her career after 2000 stalled due to a catalogue of injuries (including a torn achilles tendon).

At the 2007 World Championships in Athletics, Fraser went as part of the 4 × 400 m relay squad. Despite not running in the final, she received a bronze medal, as she competed in the heats on the second leg.

In September 2009, she announced that she was going to leave athletics to return to working full-time at EDF Energy. Her final major race was the 400 m at the British Grand Prix at Gateshead, where she finished 7th with a time of 54.11 seconds. However, she has continued to race for the Croydon Harriers, an athletics club based at the Croydon Sports Arena.

Fraser was appointed Officer of the Order of the British Empire (OBE) in the 2021 New Year Honours for services to equality, inclusion and diversity in the workplace.

Fraser currently works at the Birmingham 2022 Commonwealth Games Organising Committee as Head of Inclusion and Engagement. In 2022, she was named World Athletics' Woman of the Year.

Major achievements

1Time from the heats; Fraser was replaced in the final.

References

External links
 
 Donna Fraser, Olympics UK 

1972 births
Living people
People from Croydon
English female sprinters
Athletes (track and field) at the 1996 Summer Olympics
Athletes (track and field) at the 2000 Summer Olympics
Athletes (track and field) at the 2004 Summer Olympics
Olympic athletes of Great Britain
Athletes (track and field) at the 1998 Commonwealth Games
Commonwealth Games bronze medallists for England
Black British sportswomen
World Athletics Championships medalists
European Athletics Championships medalists
Commonwealth Games medallists in athletics
Officers of the Order of the British Empire
Olympic female sprinters
Medallists at the 1998 Commonwealth Games